Milejewo  is a village in Elbląg County, Warmian-Masurian Voivodeship, in northern Poland. It is the seat of the gmina (administrative district) called Gmina Milejewo.

The village has a population of 500.

References

Milejewo